Lac Bersau is a lake in the Pyrénées, department Pyrénées-Atlantiques, France. At an elevation of 2083 m, its surface area is 0.125 km².

Lakes of Pyrénées-Atlantiques